Kloogaranna is a village in Lääne-Harju Parish, Harju County, Estonia. It has a population of 121 (1 January 2004).

Kloogaranna has a station on the Elron rail line and is served by up to three daily trains from Tallinn main station (Balti jaam).

Kloogaranna has a long sandy beach just by the train station. During the Soviet era it was very popular, nowadays it's less crowded and for many years there were no facilities. Since 2021 there is a small café by the beach and a kiosk which sell ice cream.

See also
Klooga

References 

Villages in Harju County